Tiruvannamalai Lok Sabha constituency is one of the 39 Lok Sabha (parliamentary) constituencies in Tamil Nadu, a state in southern India. Its Tamil Nadu Parliamentary Constituency number is 11.

Assembly Segments 
Tiruvannamalai Lok Sabha constituency comprises the following legislative assembly segments:

Members of the Parliament

Election results

General Election 2019

General Election 2014

General Election 2009

References

External links
Tiruvannamalai lok sabha  constituency election 2019 date and schedule

Lok Sabha constituencies in Tamil Nadu
Tiruvannamalai district